1959 Emperor's Cup Final was the 39th final of the Emperor's Cup competition. The final was played at Koishikawa Football Stadium in Tokyo on May 6, 1959. Kwangaku Club won the championship.

Overview
Defending champion Kwangaku Club won the championship, by defeating Chuo University 1–0. Kwangaku Club won the title for 2 years in a row.

Match details

See also
1959 Emperor's Cup

References

Emperor's Cup
Emperor's Cup Final
Emperor's Cup Final
Emperor's Cup Final